Beautiful Life is the fifth studio album by Canadian country music group Doc Walker. The album was named Album of the Year at the 2008 Canadian Country Music Association Awards. It also won the 2009 Juno Award for Country Recording of the Year.

Track listing

Chart performance

Singles

References

2008 albums
Doc Walker albums
Open Road Recordings albums
Canadian Country Music Association Album of the Year albums
Juno Award for Country Album of the Year albums